Tyson Jerry (born October 23, 1983) is a Canadian Guinness World Record holder, speaker, and photographer living in Vancouver, British Columbia. He holds the world record for Longest Journey by Car Using Alternative fuel.

Biography
Jerry was born to Larry and Donna Jerry in Orangeville, Ontario and grew up in Wyevale, Ontario. He attended Wyevale Central Public School and graduated from Elmvale District High School. To put himself through post-secondary school, he worked in the silviculture industry as a tree planter and has planted over 600,000 trees and has managed the planting of 5 million trees.

Guinness world record

Jerry set the record in a car powered by alternative fuel by driving 48,535.5 km (30,158.5 mi). With support from his team, Driven to Sustain (Canada), used biodiesel and vegetable oil and starting in Columbia, South Carolina, USA on November 15, 2009, and finished in Vancouver, British Columbia, Canada on May 4, 2010.

Cloe Whittaker joined Jerry on several legs of the North American trip, providing ground support during the trip. Jerry drove through North America, parts of Canada, the U.S. and Mexico, collecting fuel at a variety of locations, including fast-food restaurants. He won the record during his second attempt. In the first attempt, a total of 19,697 km (12,239.12 mi) were completed before the Mitsubishi Delica broke down.

First attempt
Jerry made his first attempt at the world record of 38,137 km (23,697 mi) on October 1, 2008. He began in Victoria, British Columbia with partner, Cloe Whittaker. Jerry converted a 1993 Mitsubishi Delia to run on biodiesel and vegetable oil for the journey. The two traveled through Northern Canada, Alaska, and Eastern America on renewable energies without using a gas station. The attempt came to an end in Columbia, South Carolina when engine failure occurred that was caused by a slipped timing belt. The two spanned 19,697 km (12,239.12 mi) by the time their vehicle came to a stop, which was more than 66% toward breaking the world record.

Second attempt

On November 15, 2009, Jerry started the final attempt to break the world record. He traveled solo over 20,000 km and was later joined by Whittaker. After exploring nearly every state, province and territory in North America, Jerry and Whittaker broke the Guinness World Record in New York City at 38,138 km (23,698 mi) on March 22, 2010. They continued to set the existing world record for an additional 10,397 km (6,460 mi) finishing in Vancouver, British Columbia for a total of 48,535 km (30,158.5 mi).

Jerry attempted this record as an outreach campaign for environmental sustainability and energy conservation. Between launch and completion, Jerry spoke to 10,000 students continent wide. The record was covered by Reuters, Fox News, NBC, CBS, ABC, CBC's – The National, CTV's – NewsNet, The Weather Network, The Toronto Star, The Metro, JALOPNIK.

References

External links
Tyson Jerry official site
The Driven to Sustain Project

Living people
1983 births
Canadian photographers
Artists from Ontario
People from Orangeville, Ontario